Piampatara humeralis is a species of beetle in the family Cerambycidae. It was described by Per Olof Christopher Aurivillius in 1916 and is known from Brazil.

References

Hemilophini
Beetles described in 1916